The French American International School is a PK-12 independent school in San Francisco, California. The lower school (PK-8) is known as "French American" or simply "FAIS,"  FAIS is a bilingual French-English school from PK to 8th grade.  The high school, International High School, referred to as "IHS" or "International", has its own identity and French is not required to attend.  IHS is currently the only school in San Francisco to offer both the International Baccalaureate Diploma Program and the French Bac.  Over half of the incoming freshman class at IHS come from Bay Area middle schools outside of FAIS, including, Chinese American International School (CAIS), Ecole Bilingue de Berkeley, International School of the Peninsula (ISTP), Live Oak, San Francisco Day, Presidio Hill, Hamlin, SF Friends, Adda Clevenger, Brandeis, Children's Day, Katherine Delmar Burke, Marin Country Day, St. Paul Episcopal, Alice Fong Yu, Aptos, and Everett, among others. A small number of students enter from schools abroad.

Academics
The lower school (FAIS) follows a bilingual curriculum in French and English.  The high school (IHS) offers the International Baccalaureate (IB) degree as well as the French Baccalauréat ("the French Bac").  Around three-quarters of the students graduate with an IB degree. Knowledge of French is not required for the IB degree. When applying to this school in 9th grade, you may choose a second or third language such as French or Mandarin. Students who have attended this school since 6th grade may continue (if they do not want to drop out) their third language - Mandarin, Italian, Spanish, or Arabic. However, they are not obliged to keep taking French if they switch to the "IB".

See also
 Lycée Français de San Francisco
 Agence pour l'enseignement français à l'étranger

References

External links 
 Official site of French American International School of San Francisco
 Official Alumni Website

AEFE accredited schools
International schools in San Francisco
High schools in San Francisco
French-American culture in San Francisco
Private K-12 schools in California
French-language education
French international schools in the United States
Educational institutions established in 1962
1962 establishments in California